Serhiy Bezhenar (born 9 August 1970 in Nikopol, Ukrainian SSR) was a Ukrainian professional football player.

Career
He played in defense, usually as a fullback. Even though he won four championships (1995, 1996, 1997, 1998) and two cups (1996, 1998) with Dynamo Kyiv, Bezhenar was more closely associated with FC Dnipro Dnipropetrovsk.

Bezhenar played for the Soviet Union national under-21 football team and then the Ukraine national football team. For the Soviet youth team he played 6 games all during the 1992 UEFA European Under-21 Championship. Bezhenar took part in the Ukraine's first ever match, a friendly against Hungary in 1992. In total, he earned 23 caps, and scored a single goal, a penalty, in a friendly game against Belarus in Kyiv in 1994.

Career stats

International goals

References

External links
  Short career overview at ukrsoccerhistory.com
 
 Profile at TFF.org

1970 births
Living people
Soviet footballers
Ukrainian footballers
Ukrainian expatriate footballers
Ukraine international footballers
Soviet Union under-21 international footballers
FC Dnipro players
FC Dynamo Kyiv players
FC Kryvbas Kryvyi Rih players
SC Tavriya Simferopol players
FC Chernomorets Novorossiysk players
FC Prykarpattia Ivano-Frankivsk (2004) players
Erzurumspor footballers
FC Aktobe players
Soviet Top League players
Ukrainian Premier League players
Russian Premier League players
Süper Lig players
Kazakhstan Premier League players
People from Nikopol, Ukraine
Association football defenders
Expatriate footballers in Turkey
Expatriate footballers in Russia
Expatriate footballers in Kazakhstan
Ukrainian expatriate sportspeople in Turkey
Ukrainian expatriate sportspeople in Russia
Ukrainian expatriate sportspeople in Kazakhstan
Sportspeople from Dnipropetrovsk Oblast